Ali Esbati (born 12 September 1976) is an Iranian-Swedish politician of the Left Party and economist, and was the chairman of Young Left from 2001 to 2004. As of today, he is a handling officer of labour market policies at the Left Party's office of the Riksdag and the chairman of the Left Party's program commission. He became famous for his blogging; his blog Esbatis kommentarer was at one time one of the most popular Swedish political blogs.

Esbati lives in Norway. After resigning from his position as debate and opinion editor in Norwegian daily left-leaning newspaper Klassekampen, he started at the Norwegian think tank Manifest senter for samfunnsanalyse, where he now is the managing director. He is also a common contributor to several Swedish and Norwegian magazines. Esbati has also been published in a number of books.

Biography
Esbati was born in Teheran, Iran and came to Sweden in 1985 with his mother and one younger brother (his father arrived six months later). He grew up in the suburb Tensta, north of Stockholm, and joined Young Left in 1990. After primary school, he attended high school in Tensta and another one, specialized in mathematics, in Danderyd. After graduation he began studying at the Stockholm School of Economics. In 1999-2000 he completed his military service at Televapenkompaniet in Uppland, where he also was trained in Russian. He is a self-proclaimed atheist.

Utøya shooting
Esbati was invited to host a lecture at the summer camp of the Norwegian Workers' Youth League on Utøya outside Oslo 22 July 2011. There he became a witness of the shooting of 69 people by the lone gunman Anders Behring Breivik, most of them young members of the League. Esbati told afterwards that he saw how several people were killed, but managed to survive the tragedy by hiding in the surrounding woods and water.

Personal
Ali Esbati lives with journalist and former Red youth leader Marte Michelet. The couple has a daughter together.

Bibliography 
Rasismer i Europa (2004). Edited by: Étienne Balibar. Published by Agora. Note that this is an anthology and that Esbati contributed one article.
Agenda : julafton för allt reaktionärt : bloggtexter 2005-2006 (2006). Edited by: Ali Esbati and Jesper Weithz. Published by Karneval förlag. This publication is a collection of articles from Esbati's blog.
Kuba på riktigt (2007). Edited by: Ali Esbati and Daniel Suhonen. Published by Murbruk förlag. Note that this is an anthology and that is as such contains articles by several authors.

References

External links

Official blog 

1976 births
Living people
Politicians from Stockholm
Members of the Riksdag from the Left Party (Sweden)
Stockholm School of Economics alumni
Swedish bloggers
Swedish atheists
Swedish politicians of Iranian descent
Politicians from Tehran
Members of the Riksdag 2010–2014
Members of the Riksdag 2014–2018
Members of the Riksdag 2018–2022
Members of the Riksdag 2022–2026
21st-century Swedish politicians